Belonopelta is a Neotropical genus of ants in the subfamily Ponerinae. The genus contains two species: B. deletrix is known from Mesoamerica and Colombia, while B. attenuata is only known from Colombia. Members of this genus are rarely collected, and little is known about their habits. Males remain unknown for both species, and queens and larvae have only been described for B. deletrix.

Species
 Belonopelta attenuata Mayr, 1870
 Belonopelta deletrix Mann, 1922

References

Ponerinae
Ant genera
Hymenoptera of North America
Hymenoptera of South America